Towards an Urban Renaissance was a report written by the United Kingdom's Urban Task Force chaired by Lord Rogers of Riverside and published on 29 June 1999. It examined the question of how 4 million projected new homes over 25 years, might be accommodated in the UK without further encroachment into the green belt or other areas of countryside.

The review leading to the published report was commissioned by the then Deputy Prime Minister John Prescott in 1998, to identify the causes of urban decline and establish a vision for Britain's cities based on the principles of design excellence, social well-being and environmental responsibility. Participants included Peter Hall.

Towards an Urban Renaissance resulted in the Our Towns and Cities – the Future – The Urban White Paper published in 2000, and was influential in the revised Planning policy guidance note 3: Housing (PPG 3) which was also published in 2000.

Rogers published an independent update titled Towards a Strong Urban Renaissance in 2005. The report is seen as a milestone in the development of New London Vernacular, an responsive architectural style observed in London from about 2010 onwards.

Key recommendations
Design-led urban regeneration process and the designation of special urban policy areas.
Reform of the planning system and involvement of local people in decision making and neighbourhood level.
The building of 60% of new housing as schemes on brownfield land.
Better use of existing housing stock.
The relaxation of Local Planning Authority's standards relating to density and separation distances between dwellings
The better integration of housing with highways (relaxation of parking standards and designing the roads around the housing rather than the housing around the roads).
Improve non-car transport.
Better quality design.

References

External links
Towards an Urban Renaissance (1999)
 [https://web.archive.org/web/20140222053143/http://www.urbantaskforce.org/UTF_final_report.pdf Towards a Strong Urban Renaissance: The Urban Renaissance six years on (2005)]
Our Towns and Cities (2000)

Town and country planning in the United Kingdom